Pawns of Passion (German:Marter der Liebe) is a 1928 German silent drama film directed by Wiktor Biegański and Carmine Gallone and starring Olga Tschechowa, Harry Frank and Hans Stüwe. The film was released in the United States in 1929. The film is also known by several other titles including Liebeshölle.

Cast
 Olga Tschechowa as Ala Suminska 
 Harry Frank as Ihr Mann, Offizier 
 Hans Stüwe as Bruno Bronek, Maler 
 Henri Baudin as Pierre, Offizier 
 Oreste Bilancia as Jean, Bildhauer 
 Helmuth Krauß as Viktor, Maler 
 Angelo Ferrari as Robert, Maler 
 Lola Josane as Lolotte, Modell
 Sofia Szuberla as Alas Kind 
 Max Maximilian as Ein Bauer 
 Sylvia Torf as Eine Bäuerin  
 Diana Karenne   
 Sidney Suberly

References

Bibliography
Helker, Renata. Die Tschechows: Wege in die Moderne. Deutsches Theatermuseum München, 2005.
 Street, Sarah. Transatlantic Crossings: British Feature Films in the United States. Continuum, 2002.

External links

1928 films
1928 drama films
Films of the Weimar Republic
German drama films
German silent feature films
Films directed by Wiktor Bieganski
Films directed by Carmine Gallone
German black-and-white films
Silent drama films
1920s German films